Aksel Mikkelsen (14 August 1849 in Hjørring – 19 October 1929 in Korsør) was a Danish educator who introduced the Swedish system of sloyd schools into Denmark, and organized schools and seminaries on the system, which teaches manual training as an aid in developing the pupils physically and mentally as well as affording a basis of technical training. Beginning in 1907, he was inspector of the sloyd system in Denmark. He wrote books as well.

Notes

References

1849 births
1929 deaths
Danish educators
Sloyd
People from Korsør
People from Hjørring